Luis Alfonso Sosa Cisneros (born 5 October 1967) is a Mexican former professional footballer and currently manager of Leones Negros UdeG.

Managerial Statistics

Honours

Manager
Universidad Guadalajara
Ascenso MX (1): Apertura 2013
Campeón de Ascenso (1): 2013–14

Necaxa
Ascenso MX (1): Clausura 2016
Campeón de Ascenso (1): 2015–16

Atlético San Luis
Ascenso MX (2): Apertura 2018, Clausura 2019
Campeón de Ascenso (1): 2018–19

References

External links
 
 Liga MX manager profile 
 Liga MX player profile 
 

1967 births
Living people
Footballers from Guadalajara, Jalisco
Liga MX players
Leones Negros UdeG footballers
Querétaro F.C. footballers
Mexican footballers
Association football midfielders